is a Japanese heroic tale recounting the legendary exploits of Fujiwara no Hidesato. It is part of the otogi-zōshi genre of tales dating to the Edo Period or earlier. Some of the fabulous accounts are also told in the military pseudo-chronicle, Taiheiki (14th century).

He used bow and arrow to kill a giant centipede (mukade) which wrapped around a mountain near Lake Biwa, fulfilling  
the request of a serpent at a bridge, which turned out to be a court lady (or Dragon King) from the underwater . The hero was entertained at the palace and received rewards including armor and sword, and an inexhaustible bag of rice.

"My Lord Bag-O'-Rice"  is English-translated title of Basil Hall Chamberlain's retelling, published as a fairy tale (1887). This was later followed by Yei Theodora Ozaki's translation "My Lord Bag of Rice" (1903) based on 's retelling.

Setting 
The serpent, which later assumes human form, conveys Hidesato to the Dragon Palace, which can be reached through the depths of this Lake.

There is a Shinto shrine near the Seta Bridge at Lake Biwa where people have venerated Tawara Tōda.

Personage 
It was the nickname given to the historical Fujiwara no Hidesato who flourished in the first half of the 10th century and participated in the suppression of the rebel usurper Taira no Masakado.

The nickname is sometimes styled "Tawara [no] Tōta".

Summary 
The hero's centipede-slaying legend as contained in the Tawara Tōda monogatari ("The Tale of Tawara Tōda") was widely circulated and read during the early Edo Period (17th century), when the text was being copied in picture scrolls (emaki) and appearing in Otogizōshi type woodblock-printed (and hand-copied) books. A summary of the monogatari version is as follows:

The monogatari version probably derives from earlier accounts of Hidesato's centipede slaying described in the 14th-century Taiheiki, expanded with layers of legendary and religious (Buddhist) motifs. The above summary is not the entirety of Tawara Tōda monogatari, which contains a second part where the hero triumphs over Taira no Masakado, despite the latter having an iron body which was invulnerable except at the temples on his head, and having six ghostly doubles of himself.

Taiheiki version 
The 14th-century Taiheiki records a much earlier version of this legend about Hidesato, but instead of the dragon turning into a beautiful woman, it transforms into a "strange small man" – the Dragon King himself. And here, Hidesato is invited to the Dragon Palace first and thereafter combats the centipede that attacks the aquatic realm. Here the inexhaustible silk and rice bag are received from the Dragon King, but not the copper alloy pan/pot, only the copper temple-bell.

Other attestations 

The centipede coiled seven and a half turns around Mount Mikami according to popular tradition. An early written mention of this occurs in the area guidebook Ōmi yochi shiryaku (1723).

The name  has been ascribed to the sword given by the Dragon King in the Wakan sansai zue encyclopedia (1712) and the  almanac (1797).

Hidesato's alleged armor from the Dragon Palace bore the similarly scripted name  according to the Ujisatoki (before 1713).<ref>Noted by Minakata Kumagusu (1916) Jūnishikō: Tawara Tōda ryūgū-iri no hanashi 十二支考 田原藤太竜宮入りの話; </ref> , an armor with the same-sounding but differently written name, is listed as a gift of Dragon Palace in Arai Hakuseki's Honchō gunkikō (1709); this work mentions a second armor  being obtained as well.

Although not an attestation of the entire story, a sword named  purportedly owned by Hidesato according to the inscription borne on its tang was bequeathed to the Ise Shrine.

There is a legendary incident concerning the bell donated by Tawara Tōda to Mii-dera', which was serving as the bonshō''-bell to tell the hour. It happened centuries later, when Musashibō Benkei captured and dragged it up the mountain to  Eizan (Enryaku-ji), but the bell failed to toll properly. Thus the bell has been returned and has so remained at the rightful temple.

Fairy tale translations 
An English version of the tale entitled "My Lord Bag-O'-Rice" (1887) was translated by Basil Hall Chamberlain, and published as Japanese Fairy Tale Series No. 15 by Hasegawa Takejirō.

External links

Buddhist folklore
Works about dragons
Japanese fairy tales
Japanese legendary creatures
Otogi-zōshi